Surf's Up is the seventeenth studio album by American rock band the Beach Boys, released August 30, 1971 on Brother/Reprise. It received largely favorable reviews and reached number 29 on the US record charts, becoming their highest-charting LP of new music in the US since 1967. In the UK, Surf's Up peaked at number 15, continuing a string of top 40 records that had not abated since 1965.

The album's title and cover artwork (a painting based on the early 20th-century sculpture "End of the Trail") are an ironic, self-aware nod to the band's early surfing image. Originally titled Landlocked, the album took its name from the closing track "Surf's Up", a song originally intended for the group's unfinished album Smile. Most of Surf's Up was recorded from January to July 1971. In contrast to the previous LP Sunflower, Brian Wilson was not especially active in the production, which resulted in thinner vocal arrangements.

Lyrically, Surf's Up addresses environmental, social, and health concerns more than the group's previous releases. This was at the behest of newly recruited co-manager Jack Rieley, who strove to revamp the group's image and restore their public reputation following the dismal reception to their recent albums and tours. His initiatives included a promotional campaign with the tagline "it's now safe to listen to the Beach Boys" and the appointment of Carl Wilson as the band's official leader. The record also included Carl's first major song contributions: "Long Promised Road" and "Feel Flows".

Two singles were issued in the US: "Long Promised Road" and "Surf's Up". Only the former charted, when it was reissued with the B-side "Til I Die" later in the year, peaking at number 89. In 1993, Surf's Up was ranked number 46 in NMEs list of the "Top 100 Albums" in history. In 2000, it ranked number 230 in Colin Larkin's All Time Top 1000 Albums. , it is ranked as the 761st highest rated album of all time on Acclaimed Music. Session highlights, outtakes, and alternate mixes from the album were collected for the 2021 compilation Feel Flows.

Background

On the evening of July 29, 1970, Brian Wilson, accompanied by Mike Love and Bruce Johnston, granted his first-ever full-length radio interview to KPFK DJ John Frank, also known as Jack Rieley. In the interview, Wilson mentioned that although he is "proud of the group and the name", he felt that "the clean American thing has hurt us. And we're really not getting any kind of airplay today." Among other topics, Wilson stated that the group was not "putting enough spunk in our production and I don't know who to blame. ... Another thing is that we haven't done enough to change our image, though. ... we sort of operate a democracy thing in our productions. Maybe that's the problem. I don't know." The subject eventually turned to "Surf's Up", an unreleased song from the band's unfinished album Smile. Brian said he did not want to release the song because it was "too long".

On August 8, Rieley sent the band a six-page memo that explained how to stimulate "increased record sales and popularity". At the end of August, the group's latest record Sunflower was released as their first album on Reprise Records. It became the worst-selling album in the group's history. Band promoter and co-manager Fred Vail remembered one meeting with the band in which "we were talking about ... Sunflower not charting, and they were wondering why. I said to them, 'Listen, this is a phase right now. If you stay the course, your real audience won't forget you. They won't desert you.' But the Beach Boys really didn't believe in themselves." Vail was soon replaced by Rieley, primarily at the instigation of Love and Johnston.

Some of Rieley's earliest initiatives were to end the group's practice of wearing matching stage uniforms and to appoint Carl Wilson as the band's official leader. The group spent the majority of September and October rehearsing for upcoming concerts. On October 3, at the invitation of Van Dyke Parks, the band performed two sets at the eighth annual Big Sur Folk Festival in California to an audience of 6,000. According to music historian Keith Badman, the performances "help[ed] to establish the group's image in the eyes of the rock hierarchy, and they are subsequently 'rediscovered' as an important live act." Biographer David Leaf wrote that the concert inspired what was effectively an apologetic review from Rolling Stone co-founder Jann Wenner, who previously criticized the band for pulling out of the 1967 Monterey Pop Festival. A rumor circulated among news outlets who reported that Brian was then writing music with Parks for an upcoming Beach Boys television special, H-2-0.

In early November, Brian temporarily rejoined the touring band in playing four dates at the Whisky a Go Go. The group had not played a concert in Los Angeles since 1966, while Brian had not performed with the touring group since early 1970, when he briefly filled in for Love. These performances served as a warm-up to the band's second major tour of the year, which lasted from November 19 to December 20, around the UK and Europe. Guitarist Ed Carter and keyboardist Daryl Dragon accompanied the band for this tour, along with supporting act the Flame. Reports from this period suggested that the group were planning to move from Los Angeles to Britain once their recording commitments were finished. From January to early April 1971, they worked intermittently on their second album for Reprise.

Production and style

Surf's Up was recorded between January and July 1971, with the exception of a few tracks. After the release of Sunflower, band engineer Stephen Desper assembled a collection of songs consisting mostly of outtakes deemed suitable for a follow-up LP, which he labelled "Second Brother Album". Rieley later called these selections "forgettable" and said that he was "totally perplexed ... I met with [Warner executive] Mo Ostin, a true Brian Wilson fan, at Warner Brothers, who listened to the songs, and he declared: 'No way.'"

Rieley encouraged them to write songs with more socially conscious and topical lyrics, although he stated in a 2013 interview, "It was not part of a master plan. ... We never had any 'What are we gonna write about?' meeting. Never once did anything like that ever occur." He assigned the project the brief working title of Landlocked to represent "a demarcation line, separating striped-shirted bullshit that had become irrelevant, an object of public scorn, from artistry, creativity and great new songs." An album cover was designed with this title, featuring white san-serif [sic] letters printed atop a photograph of a dark field.

The Landlocked cover was ultimately discarded in favor of a different design. Rieley said that the final cover "was something that caught my eye at an antique record shop near Silver Lake. It was a painting and I bought it. It reminded me a bit of the Brother Records logo, but it was different." Conversely, Desper recalled that a print of a painting of the End of the Trail, "use[d] to hang in Murry Wilson's office behind his desk, as Brian recalls from his childhood. Brian always like[d] the painting as it was part of Denny's, Carl's and his youth." Surf's Up was the first album for which the group printed the lyrics of each song on the record sleeve.

In 1974, Rieley stated that his growing involvement with the songwriting process attracted the ire of Love, Johnston, and Al Jardine, who "tried to force me to march into Mo Ostin's and sell him on their 1969 track 'Loop De Loop'". I refused and Brian, Dennis, and Carl backed me up." Due to Brian's reduced involvement, the vocal arrangements were not as dense as those for Sunflower. Johnston recalled, "It was strange to be doing vocal arrangements to make it sound like the Beach Boys when we were the Beach Boys. That's a little weird to me."

Songs

"Long Promised Road" and "Feel Flows" were Carl's first significant solo compositions and were recorded almost entirely by himself. "Student Demonstration Time" (a topical reworking of Jerry Leiber and Mike Stoller's R&B classic "Riot in Cell Block Number 9") and the environmental anthem "Don't Go Near the Water" found Love and Jardine embracing the group's new socially conscious direction.

"Til I Die" was a song Brian had been working on since mid-1970. It was written while he was suffering from an existential crisis, and he took weeks to refine the arrangement, using an electronic drum machine and crafting a harmony-driven, vibraphone and organ-laden background. "A Day in the Life of a Tree", written by Brian and Rieley, is about a tree succumbing to the effects of environmental pollution; the accompaniment includes harmonium, an antique pump organ, and a smaller pipe organ.

Johnston said that he wrote "Disney Girls (1957)" "because I saw so many kids in our audiences being wiped out on drugs" and wanted to capture the feeling of an era in which people were "a little naive but a little healthier." Jardine also contributed "Take a Load Off Your Feet", a Sunflower outtake, and "Lookin' at Tomorrow (A Welfare Song)", both co-written with longtime friend Gary Winfrey. Biographer Timothy White wrote that the latter song was "a poignant mini-soliloquy from a jobless rounder, seems like a coda to 'Long Promised Road,' the pioneer busted in his starry-eyed ambitions but still 'looking at tomorrow' for a fresh potential." Jardine said that it was "actually an old folk song" to which he "rewrote the lyrics to reflect the times".

Rieley had asked Brian about including "Surf's Up" on Landlocked, and in early June, Brian suddenly gave approval for Carl and Rieley to finish the song. Carl overdubbed a new vocal in the song's first part, the original backing track dating from November 1966. The second movement consisted of a December 1966 solo piano demo recorded by Brian, augmented with vocal and Moog synthesizer overdubs. Johnston recalled, "We ended up doing vocals to sort of emulate ourselves without Brian Wilson, which was kind of silly." With the song completed, Landlocked was given the new title of Surf's Up.

Leftover material

Dennis Wilson's songs "4th of July" and "(Wouldn't It Be Nice to) Live Again" were recorded in early 1971 but left off the record. In a September 1971 interview, Dennis stated, "I have a belief in my music. And it sounds nothing like it should on the album – it should have a flow on it from one song to another ... It didn't sound like The Beach Boys. They thought it did. I said ‘Bullshit’ and pulled my songs off." According to Rieley, the absence of any Dennis songs on Surf's Up was for two reasons: to quell political infighting within the group concerning the album's share of Wilson-brother songs, and because Dennis wanted to save his songs for a solo album, projected for release in 1971.

"(Wouldn't It Be Nice to) Live Again" was written with Stanley Shapiro. According to Beach Boys biographer Jon Stebbins, Dennis had wanted the song to close the record, following Til I Die", but Carl objected. In 2013, it was released for the box set Made in California, along with a 1974 recording of "Barnyard Blues", a song that Dennis had composed during the Surf's Up sessions. Dennis also recorded "Barbara", a piano demo named after his then-girlfriend, and a track called "Old Movie". "Barbara" was released in 1998 for the Endless Harmony Soundtrack.

Other outtakes include Brian's "My Solution" and "H.E.L.P. Is On the Way". According to singer Terry Jacks, the group asked him to be their producer for a session. On July 31, 1970, they attempted a rendition of the Jacques Brel/Rod McKuen song "Seasons in the Sun", but the session went badly, and the track was never finished. Jacks later had a hit with his own version of the song in 1974. Afterward, Mike Love told an interviewer: "We did record a version [of 'Seasons'] but it was so wimpy we had to throw it out. ... It was just the wrong song for us. I'm glad Terry had a hit with it." Love's "Big Sur", recorded in August 1970, was later remade in a different time signature for the 1973 album Holland. In March 1971, Carl recorded a Moog synthesizer sound collage titled "Telephone Backgrounds (On a Clear Day)".

Release

Rieley arranged for the group to appear in a series of commercials with the tagline "It's now safe to listen to the Beach Boys." He also arranged a guest appearance at a Grateful Dead concert at Bill Graham's Fillmore East in April 1971 to foreground the band's transition into the counterculture. For their performances this year, the Beach Boys enlisted a full horn section and additional percussionists. A journalist who attended the show later reported that Bob Dylan, who was watching from the sound booth, remarked aloud, "You know, they're pretty fucking good." Contrary to what is later written of the show, the Grateful Dead's audience was unfavorable toward the Beach Boys' appearance. On May 1, the band performed at The Peace Treaty Celebration Rock Show, an anti-war rally concert organized by the Mayday Collective, with approximately 500,000 people in attendance. Footage of the band performing "Student Demonstration Time" later appeared in the 1985 documentary An American Band.

On May 24, "Long Promised Road" (B-side "Deirdre") was issued as lead single, becoming their sixth consecutive US single that failed to chart. That same month, Dennis accidentally punched his hand through a glass window, severing nerves and tendons. The injury left him unable to play drums for the band, and so he was replaced by the Flame's Ricky Fataar. Dennis continued to make occasional appearances at concerts, singing or playing keyboards. In July, the American music press rated the Beach Boys "the hottest grossing act" in the country, alongside Grand Funk Railroad. On July 7, the film Two-Lane Blacktop, co-starring Dennis, made its worldwide premier in New York City. Despite critical acclaim, the film was largely unnoticed by cinema-goers.

Surf's Up was released on August 30 to more public anticipation than the Beach Boys had had for several years. Aided by some FM radio exposure, it outperformed Sunflower commercially and was their best selling album in years. On September 6, Time reported that the album was "doing well enough. Barely out, it is fast approaching $250,000 in sales."  From September 22 to October 2, the band toured the eastern US, but the performances received mixed reviews. Their setlists included every song from the album except Til I Die" and "A Day in the Life of a Tree". Dennis also played solo piano renditions of his unreleased songs "Barbara" and "I've Got a Friend".

On October 28, the Beach Boys were the featured cover story on that date's issue of Rolling Stone. It included the first part of a lengthy two-part interview, titled "The Beach Boys: A California Saga", conducted by journalists Tom Nolan and David Felton. Unusually, the story devoted minimal attention to the group's music, and instead focused on the band's internal dynamics and history, particularly around the period when they fell out of step with the 1960s counterculture. At the end of the month, Surf's Up peaked on the US charts at number 29, becoming their highest-charting album there since Wild Honey (1967).

In the UK, Surf's Up was released by EMI's Stateside label in October and peaked at number 15. Rieley was unhappy with the delay, remarking that the album "sold more import copies than they sold of British pressings." The UK singles, "Long Promised Road" (B-side "Deirdre") and "Don't Go Near the Water" (B-side "Student Demonstration Time"), failed to chart. In November, "Surf's Up" (B-side "Don't Go Near the Water") was released as the last US single and failed to chart.

Contemporary reviews
Surf's Up received generally favorable reviews. Times reviewer described it as "one of the most imaginatively produced LPs since last fall's All Things Must Pass by George Harrison and Phil Spector". A Rolling Stone writer stated: "the Beach Boys stage a remarkable comeback ... an LP that weds their choral harmonies to progressive pop and which shows youngest Wilson brother Carl stepping into the fore of the venerable outfit." In his review for the magazine, Arthur Schmidt was effused with the record, highlighting "Surf's Up" and "Disney Girls" as his favorite songs, and wrote: "This is a good album, probably as good as Sunflower, which is terrific ... It is certainly the most original in that it has contributed something purely its own." Richard Williams of The Times called the record "mostly very good" in his review;"  in another review of the album from 1972, he wrote that it "won't disappoint anyone at all ... they've produced an album which fully backs up all that's recently been written and said about them." NMEs Richard Green called it a "very good album, very different from anything they've done before."

Robert Christgau of The Village Voice was less impressed. While highlighting "Take a Load Off Your Feet" and "Disney Girls (1957)", he found most of the other songs forgettable and the album the group's worst since 1968's Friends, before writing, "Van Dyke Parks's wacked-out lyricist meandering is matched by the sophomoric spiritual quest of Jack Rieley, and the music drags hither and yon." In The Rag, Metal Mike Saunders lamented that most of the press furor over the Beach Boys' reputed comeback "has been rubbish" and opined that Surf's Up suffered from the same issues as Sunflower, namely "horrendous production and engineering" and a lack of "focus". He wrote, "At any rate, the Brian Wilson Enigma remains unanswered, and the Beach Boys without him are just another rock group." The Guardians Geoffrey Cannon felt that the album was inconsistent.

Retrospective assessments and legacy

In 1974, the staff of NME ranked Surf's Up number 96 in their list of the "Top 100 Albums" of all time. When the magazine surveyed its writers again in 1993, the album's position rose to number 46. In 2000, the record was voted number 230 in the third edition of Colin Larkin's All Time Top 1000 Albums. In 2004, Surf's Up was ranked number 61 on Pitchforks list of "The Top 100 Albums of the 1970s". Contributor Dominique Leone wrote: 

Music critic John Bush wrote "[Most of the] songs are enjoyable enough, but the last three tracks are what make Surf's Up such a masterpiece." Mojo critic Ross Bennett regarded Surf's Up as "the definitive version" of the Smile recordings, "with those crystalline vocals imbuing Parks' cryptic verses with a grace and simplicity missing from the 2004 reboot". Keith Phipps from The A.V. Club called it "the darkest album of the group's career, a record that also spotlighted a growing social conscience".

Conversely, Scott Schinder wrote in Icons of Rock (2006) that Surf's Up "lacked the solid group dynamic that had elevated Sunflower" despite two "impressive songwriting contributions from Carl". James E. Perone, writing in The 100 Greatest Bands of All Time (2015), opined that "the album's lyrical themes are so wide ranging that the social commentary tended to get somewhat lost, and the year 1971 was late enough in the counterculture era that 'Student Demonstration Time' and 'A Day in the Life of a Tree' seem like a case of too little, too late." Stebbins opined that the album suffered from a lack of Dennis songs and was not as strong as Sunflower in its totality. Record Collectors Jamie Atkins said that the lack of Dennis songs was balanced by the strong offerings from Carl, although Rieley's "awkward wordplay ... was rather less clever than he had perhaps intended. Happily, they did not detract from the quality of the songs:"

Surf's Up was the last Beach Boys album recorded with Bruce Johnston until 1979's L.A. (Light Album). He later criticized the record: "To me, Surf's Up is, and always has been, one hyped up lie! It was a false reflection of The Beach Boys and one which Jack [Rieley] engineered right from the start. ... It made it look like Brian Wilson was more than just a visitor at those sessions. Jack made it appear as though Brian was really there all the time." In another interview, Johnston said: "All I can say is that at the beginning, I thought that what he was trying to do was absolutely right on the money. He helped the band become aware of what our niche was in pop music."

The record is also listed in the musical reference book 1001 Albums You Must Hear Before You Die. In 2014, John Wetton named Surf's Up his favorite prog album of all-time, elaborating: "The summer of '71 had so many musical milestones ... but Surf's Up was a revelation. I was in Family, a major player in the first wave of British progressive bands, but this collection from the iconic California surf-pop band shifted my parameters, blurring all the boundaries of my musical vocabulary. ... And the cover? Mega prog!" , it is listed as the 761st-highest rated album of all time on Acclaimed Music.

Track listing

Original release

Feel Flows

In 2021, expanded editions of Sunflower and Surf's Up were packaged within Feel Flows, a box set that includes session highlights, outtakes, and alternate mixes drawn from the two albums. The set also includes the first ever releases of the Surf's Up-era outtakes "Big Sur" (1970 version), "Sweet and Bitter", "My Solution", "Seasons in the Sun", "Baby Baby", "Awake", and "It's a New Day".

Personnel
Credits per Craig Slowinski.

The Beach Boys
 Al Jardine - lead and backing vocals, electric guitars, acoustic guitars, banjo, piano, bass guitar
 Bruce Johnston - lead and backing vocals, pianos, Hammond organ, Moog synthesizer, mandolins
 Mike Love - lead and backing vocals, tambourine
 Brian Wilson - lead and backing vocals, Baldwin organ, Hammond organ, harmonium, Moog synthesizer, Rocksichord, piano, harmonica, bass guitar, snare drum, percussion, Rolls-Royce Phantom V
 Carl Wilson - lead and backing vocals, electric guitars, acoustic guitars, pianos, pianos w/ taped strings, Wurlitzer electric pianos, Baldwin organ, Hammond organ, Moog synthesizer, bass guitar, drums, percussion
 Dennis Wilson - backing vocals, drums

Additional members from the touring band
 Ed Carter - electric guitar, acoustic guitars
 Daryl Dragon - Moog synthesizer, pipe organs, piano, electric guitar, bass guitar, vibraphone
 Dennis Dragon - drums
 Mike Kowalski - drums, percussion

Guests
 Blondie Chaplin - bass guitar
 Bill DeSimone - backing vocals
 Kathy Dragon - flutes
Van Dyke Parks – vocals on "A Day in the Life of a Tree"
Jack Rieley – lead vocals on "A Day in the Life of a Tree" and backing vocals in "Surf's Up" tag, breathing effects on “Feel Flows”
Diane Rovell - backing vocals
 Marilyn Wilson - backing vocals
 Gary Winfrey - backing vocals

Additional session musicians

 Arthur Brieglab - French horn
 Jimmy Bond - double bass
 Frank Capp - car keys, hi-hat
 Al Casey - electric guitar
 Roy Caton - trumpet
 Al De Lory - pianos
 David Duke - French horn, Wagner tuba
 Glenn Ferris - trombone
 Sam Freed - violin
 David Frisina - violin
 George Hyde - French horn
 Anatol Kaminsky - violin
 Nathan Kaproff - violin
 George Kast - violin
 Carol Kaye - bass guitar
 Charles Lloyd - tenor saxophone, flute
 Sal Marquez - trumpet
 Roger Neumann - tenor saxophone
 Nick Pellico - glockenspiel
 Joel Peskin - tenor saxophone
 Mike Price - trumpet
 Claude Sherry - French horn
 Woody Theus - bass drum, jingle sticks

Additional musicians and production staff
 The Beach Boys – producer
 Stephen Desper – chief engineer and mixer, Moog synthesizer, bird sfx
 Ed Thrasher – original art direction

Charts

Notes

References

Bibliography

Further reading

External links

1971 albums
The Beach Boys albums
Capitol Records albums
Reprise Records albums
Progressive pop albums
Albums produced by the Beach Boys
Albums recorded at United Western Recorders
Albums recorded at Sunset Sound Recorders
Albums recorded in a home studio
Environmental songs